Shelby County Airport  is a public airport located 1 mile (2 km) northwest of Shelbyville, in Shelby County, Missouri, USA.

Facilities 
 Runway 17/35: 2,300 x 46 ft. (701 x 14 m), Surface: Turf

External links 

Airports in Missouri
Buildings and structures in Shelby County, Missouri